The Latin Tropical Airplay chart is a music chart that ranks the best-performing tropical songs of the United States. It has since been renamed the Tropical Songs chart. Published by Billboard magazine, the data are compiled by Nielsen Broadcast Data Systems based on each single's weekly airplay.

Chart history

References

2002
United States Latin Tropical Airplay
2002 in Latin music